Carolyn Ann Bennett  (born December 20, 1950) is a Canadian physician and politician who has served as minister of mental health and addictions, and associate minister of health since October 26, 2021. A member of the Liberal Party, she has represented Toronto—St. Paul's in the House of Commons since 1997. She previously served as the minister of state for public health from 2003 to 2006, and the Minister of Crown–Indigenous Relations from 2015 to 2021. Bennett worked as a physician for 20 years before entering politics.

Early life, education and career
Carolyn Ann Bennett was born in Toronto on December 20, 1950. She attended Havergal College. She graduated with a degree in medicine from the University of Toronto in 1974  and received her certification in family medicine in 1976. In 2004, she was awarded an honorary fellowship from the Society of Obstetricians and Gynaecologists of Canada for her contributions to medicine, especially women's health.

Professional career 
Bennett was a family physician for 20 years before entering politics.

Bennett worked as a family physician at Wellesley Hospital and Women's College Hospital in Toronto from 1977 to 1997 and was a founding partner in Bedford Medical Associates. She was also president of the medical staff association of Women's College Hospital and has a clinical adjunct appointment as an assistant professor in the department of family and community medicine at the University of Toronto. Bennett served on the boards of Havergal College, Women's College Hospital, the Ontario Medical Association, and the Medico-Legal Society of Toronto.

Bennett co-authored Kill or Cure? How Canadians Can Remake their Health Care System with Rick Archbold, it was published in October 2000.

Political career 
Bennett ran for public office in the 1995 Ontario provincial election as a candidate of the Ontario Liberal Party.  Running in the riding of St. Andrew—St. Patrick, she lost to Progressive Conservative candidate Isabel Bassett by about 3,500 votes.

Bennett was more successful in the 1997 federal election, defeating her closest opponent in St. Paul's Peter Atkins by almost 15,000 votes. She was re-elected by increased margins in the elections of 2000 and 2004.

On December 12, 2003, after Paul Martin became Prime Minister, he appointed Bennett as his Minister of State for Public Health. In her two years as Minister, she set up the Public Health Agency of Canada, appointed the first chief public health officer for Canada, and established the Public Health Network.

She was chair of the Canada-Israel Friendship Group from 1999 to 2003 and is a member of Liberal Parliamentarians for Israel.

In the 2006 election, Bennett defeated two main challengers who were both touted as star candidates, Peter Kent of the Conservatives and Paul Summerville of the New Democratic Party. Bennett was re-elected, but lost her cabinet position as the Liberals were defeated.   She became only the third opposition MP in the history of St. Paul's.  The riding had once been a noted bellwether, but swung heavily to the Liberals along with most other central Toronto ridings.

She announced on April 24, 2006 that she would pursue the leadership of the party. On September 15, 2006, she withdrew from the leadership race and threw her support behind former Ontario Premier Bob Rae.

In the 39th Parliament, Bennett was the Official Opposition critic for social development, social economy, seniors, persons with disabilities, and public health.

She was re-elected in 2008. In the 40th Parliament, Bennett was the Official Opposition critic for health.

She was re-elected in 2011. In the 41st Parliament, Bennett was the Liberal critic for Indian Affairs and Northern Development, Aboriginal Affairs, Northern Development, and the Canadian Northern Economic Development Agency.

On November 4, 2015, Bennett was appointed the Minister of Indigenous and Northern Affairs, which was later renamed the position of Minister of Crown-Indigenous Relations in the present Cabinet, headed by Justin Trudeau. She is the fifth most senior member of Justin Trudeau's cabinet. She was re-elected in 2019.

On June 24, 2021, Bennett was forced to apologize to Jody Wilson-Raybould for her response to a tweet by Wilson-Reybould concerning Justin Trudeau and his government's response to the discovery of hundreds of unmarked graves at Marieval Indian Residential School in Saskatchewan. Referencing her tweet, Bennett sent texted Wilson-Reybould the single-word message "Pension?". Wilson-Reybould called it "racist and misogynistic", posting a screenshot of the message on Twitter.

Personal life
She is married to Canadian film producer Peter O'Brian. They have two sons, Jack and Ben.

Awards 
 Royal Life Saving Society Service Cross (1986)
 EVE Award for Contributing to the Advancement of Women in Politics (2002)
 CAMIMH Mental Health Champion Award (2003) 
 Federation of Medical Women of Canada May Cohen Award (2006)
 W. Victor Johnston Award for Lifetime Contribution to Family Medicine in Canada and Internationally (2009) 
 National Award of Excellence for Outstanding Leadership and Dedication to Injury Prevention and Safety

Electoral record

Toronto—St. Paul's, 2015–present

St. Paul's, 1997-2015 

*Comparison to total of Progressive Conservative and Canadian Alliance vote in 2000.

Note: Canadian Alliance vote is compared to the Reform vote in 1997 election.

References

External links 
 
Bio & Mandate from Prime Minister

1950 births
Canadian general practitioners
Women members of the House of Commons of Canada
Liberal Party of Canada MPs
Living people
Members of the House of Commons of Canada from Ontario
Members of the King's Privy Council for Canada
Ontario Liberal Party candidates in Ontario provincial elections
Politicians from Toronto
People from Old Toronto
University of Toronto alumni
Women in Ontario politics
Canadian Ministers of Indian Affairs and Northern Development
Members of the 27th Canadian Ministry
Members of the 29th Canadian Ministry
Women government ministers of Canada
Canadian women physicians
21st-century Canadian women politicians
Havergal College alumni